Mattocks is a surname. Notable people with the surname include:

Charles Mattocks (1840-1910), American colonel in Union Army
Christopher Sutton-Mattocks (born in 1951), English barrister and cricketer
Claude Mattocks (born in 1980), Italian footballer
Darren Mattocks (born in 1990), Jamaican footballer
Doug Mattocks (1944-1999), English cricketer
Gary Mattocks (born in 1931), American football coach
George Mattocks (1735-1804), British stage actor and singer
Isabella Mattocks (1746-1826), British actress and singer
John Mattocks (1777-1847), American politician from Vermont
Samuel Mattocks (1739-1804), American politician in Vermont

See also
Mattock (surname)
William Edward Mattocks House, a historic house in North Carolina